The Thiruvananthapuram–Silchar Aronai Superfast Express is a Superfast Express train belonging to Indian Railways. It is the 28th longest train service in the world. On 21 November 2017, it was extended to Silchar. After this extension, it is now the longest-running superfast train and the second longest running train in India.

The express train service was started on 14 April 1987. It operates as train number 12507 from Thiruvananthapuram Central to Silchar and as train number 12508 in the reverse direction serving the 8 states of Assam, West Bengal, Bihar, Jharkhand, Odisha, Andhra Pradesh, Tamil Nadu and Kerala.

Service

See also
Longest train services of Indian Railways
Dibrugarh–Tambaram Express
Chennai–New Jalpaiguri SF Express
Guwahati–Bengaluru Cantt. Superfast Express
New Tinsukia–Bengaluru Weekly Express
Bangalore Cantonment–Agartala Humsafar Express
Yesvantpur–Kamakhya AC Superfast Express

References

External links

Express trains in India
Rail transport in Assam
Rail transport in West Bengal
Rail transport in Bihar
Rail transport in Jharkhand
Rail transport in Odisha
Rail transport in Andhra Pradesh
Rail transport in Tamil Nadu
Rail transport in Kerala
Transport in Guwahati
Transport in Thiruvananthapuram